The Moonlight Clan is a large group of people (particularly young people) who expend their entire salary before the end of each month.
The term is derived from a lunar cycle. While yue guang translates directly to "moonlight", it is also a pun derived from the combination of its individual words, yue (月; month or moon) and guang (光; 'empty, used up, or light'). Zu ('clan, race') refers to a group of people who shares this characteristic. In the United States, a comparable notion is referred to as "living paycheck to paycheck". "Moonlight clan" is a relatively new Chinese neologism to describe young workers who spend their salaries faster than they earn it. Opposite of the Western definition of the word "moonlighting," which means to take on more than one job to earn more money. The Moonlite (people of Moonlight clan) are generally younger generations. They are different from their parents' diligent and thrifty consumption concepts. To chase new trends and have fun, they don't care about the cost as long as they like. Material life is what they yearn for, but also the motivation to earn money. The older generation believes that "saving is more significant than spending", and they are very upset about their behavior; however, their motto is "spending can lead to make more money". The Moonlite are companies' favorite group of consumers, since they have strong purchasing power from desires; more importantly, they have the ability to make money and have money to spend.

Categories

Type 1: People who have a relatively high income
This group of people can not only meet the basic needs but can also pursue a higher standard of living. Members of this group include white collar workers and the middle class.

Behavior and lifestyle
Members of the Moonlight Clan who earn a relatively high income tend towards economic materialism. Most of them lack financial discipline (i.e. overspending) and fail to plan for the future. People earning a relatively high income are usually brand-loyal consumers who pursue pleasure-seeking and luxurious lifestyles. They tend to have strong consumption confidence.

Type 2: People who can barely make ends meet and possibly rely on welfare
This group of people struggle to meet basic needs, thus having a lower standard of living in comparison to Type 1. This group is mainly constituted by low socio-economic groups including people who are paid low hourly wages minimum wage, such as blue-collar workers.

Behavior and lifestyle
Lower-income consumers spend mostly on necessities and rent as they are burdened by the rising cost of living. They do not have extra money for expensive pleasure-seeking activities and luxurious goods.

Characteristics 

 No career planning and Uncertainty of goals

Most of the Moonlite have no plans for their own careers. They don't have any goals. Moreover, such people are not serious about their work and have no desire to make progress. People with plans generally do better than those who just muddle along.

 Lazy to work and Addictive to play

They spend more time and energy on entertainment. For them, work is to complete a task. By doing work, they will have more money to spend. Such people seem to be very chic every day, but actually, they feel empty inside. They cannot enrich themselves compared to those who work hard. Psychologically, those people are more likely to have a lazy vicious circle.

 Dare not face difficulties and stress

Because the Moonlite can't get enough financial support, they will not dare to face difficulties afterwards. However, in fact, the problem still exists, and the more they accumulate, the more difficult it is. People whose financial income is guaranteed and have plans for their own funds should have a rational life. While facing difficulties, they will not be inferior to solve it. Accumulated problems could lead to life pressures.

Causes

Low income and high cost of living
With reference to the 2011 Population Census in Thematic Report: Youth, the median income monthly of teenagers aged from fifteen to twenty-four remained at HKD $8,000 unchanged for 10 years since 2001. The median monthly income of the whole population had increased to HKD$9,000 over the past ten years. The Consumer Price Index of Hong Kong increased by thirteen percent, from 96 to 109 index points, during 2001 and 2011. The lower income group could hardly afford the progression of standard of living of the society. As a result, the high cost of living leads to an increase in the number of Moonlight Clan members.

Poor money management
Lacking knowledge in money management, personal budgeting and saving, people seldom track their spending habits and savings to review their expenses. According to a survey conducted by the University of Hong Kong, less than one third of the respondents would save their income before spending, or even spend more than what they are earning in a month.

Consumer culture
Being bombarded by commercial advertisements, people with relatively high incomes feel compelled to pursue personal wellbeing and happiness through material possessions. An easy access to a variety of entertainment and activities may be the reason for the increase in consumerism for Moonlight Clan as they tend to spend and enjoy the present instead of saving for the future.

Advanced technology and convenience
By using credit cards, people can spend money they have not earned. In recent years, the credit card industry has been burgeoning, making credit cards available for almost everyone with insufficient screening. In Hong Kong, the credit card rates are rising and the debt they are carrying is 30% or above for annualized interest.

Furthermore, online buying is becoming more and more popular. People can frequent online shopping and auction sites like Amazon.com, Taobao.com, eBay.com,  and make online payments via acquirers like PayPal. This may affect their financial discipline and foster overspending behavior, becoming one of the underlying causes of compulsive or obsessive consumerism.

Family 
The average Moonlite have a relatively wealthy backup from their families. There is not much life pressure. They do not need to consider supporting parents or other folks. It is enough to just work and support for themselves. They haven't experience too much difficulties. After getting paid, they only think of buying goods and services, instead of planning for saving.

Benefits 
Everyone's attitude towards life is different. Some people would like to live a stable life, save their wages for the urgent needs in future; some people pay attention to timely pleasure, feel that the money they earn should be spend soon without concerns. No matter which lifestyle has its own benefits. Many people may think that the Moonlight clan is equal to the black sheep. In fact, the Moonlight clan has its own value. It is undoubted that the Moonlite's attitude towards life in a timely manner which can promote economic development. They also enjoy what others can't enjoy.

Population

Mainland China 
A survey in 2011 on Guangzhou youth aged fifteen to thirty-five revealed that thirty-five percent of interviewees were part of the Moonlight Clan. Their average expenditure is two-thirds of the average income. Moreover, there are approximately three hundred million people earning less than $2 a day. These people constitute the main part of the moonlight clan of the low income group.

In the middle of 2019, the People's Bank of China released the "2019 Consumer Financial Literacy Survey Report" which is a comprehensive analysis of the financial literacy of Chinese consumers from perspectives of attitude, behavior, knowledge and skill. Among the 18,600 samples surveyed, most consumers paid more attention to personal credit score. The willingness to delay consumption declined slightly. 79.03% of consumers disapproved of being "moonlight clan" and only 17.80% of "strongly agree" or "considerable".

Hong Kong
In 2012, MassMutual Asia Ltd commissioned the Public Opinion Programme of the University of Hong Kong to conduct a telephone survey about post-80s and post-90s. The survey findings revealed that one out of seven respondents represented the Moonlight Clan, as they spent as much as they earned monthly, or even spent more than they earned.

In 2017, one in every six people in Hong Kong, aged 18 to 35, doesn't have any money spare to save each month. That is worse than in 2013 when one in every seven people didn't save. Hong Kong was frequently voted as the most expensive city to live in globally. However, young people in this city would rather spend their money on travel and the latest gizmos rather than save it, which is why for many of them, owning a property in the city is not a priority.

See also
 Working poor

References

Chinese culture